The World of Watches (Vselennaya "Dozorov") is a media franchise consisting of six novels, several short stories, two films and two video games based on a fictional world created by Russian author Sergei Lukyanenko. Another Russian writer Vladimir Vasilyev is co-author of Day Watch and author of Face of Black Palmyra.

List of works

Novels
Night Watch
Day Watch
Face of Black Palmyra
Twilight Watch
Final Watch
New Watch
Sixth Watch

Films
Night Watch (2004)
Day Watch (2006)

Video game
Night Watch (2005)
Day Watch (2007)

Mass media franchises
Night Watch
20th Century Studios franchises